The 2023 season is Penangs 97th competitive season, 3rd season in the first tier of Malaysian football since promoted in 2020, 102nd year in existence as a football club, and the 3rd year since rebranded as Penang Football Club. The season covers the period from 1 December 2022 to 30 November 2023.

Coaching Staffs

Transfers and contracts

Released

In

1st Transfer Window

Friendlies

Competitions

Malaysia Super League

League table

Result summary

Results by matchday

Matches

Malaysia FA Cup

Statistics

Appearances and goals

Top scorers
The list is sorted by shirt number when total goals are equal.

Top assists
An assist is credited to a player for passing or crossing the ball to the scorer, a player whose shot rebounds (off a defender, goalkeeper or goalpost) to a teammate who scores, and a player who wins a penalty kick or a free kick for another player to convert.

The list is sorted by shirt number when total goals are equal.

Clean sheets
The list is sorted by shirt number when total clean sheets are equal.

Summary

References

2023
Penang F.C.
Penang